Joseph Bernard André Geoffrion (February 14, 1931 – March 11, 2006), nicknamed "Boom Boom", was a Canadian professional ice hockey player and coach. Generally considered one of the innovators of the slapshot, he was inducted into the Hockey Hall of Fame in 1972 following a 16-year career with the Montreal Canadiens and New York Rangers of the National Hockey League. In 2017 Geoffrion was named one of the '100 Greatest NHL Players' in history.

Playing career
Geoffrion was born in Montreal, Quebec, and began playing in the NHL in 1951. He earned the nickname "Boom Boom" for his thundering slapshot (which Geoffrion claimed to have 'invented' as a youngster ) from sportswriter Charlie Boire of the Montreal Star in the late 1940s while playing junior hockey for the Laval Nationale. He was the second player in NHL history to score 50 goals in one season, the first being teammate Maurice Richard. Half the time, he played left-wing on Montreal's front line with fellow superstars Richard and Jean Béliveau, helping the Canadiens to six Stanley Cup championships, and at other times was right wing on the No. 2 line. But Geoffrion had a hard time convincing the NHL of his considerable talents; Maurice Richard, Jean Beliveau, Bobby Hull (Chicago Blackhawks) and Gordie Howe (Detroit Red Wings) were so good that they overshadowed him. Even after Geoffrion won the Art Ross Trophy as league scoring champion in 1955, NHL First All-Star honours went to Richard, while Geoffrion only was selected to the second.

However, Geoffrion's resulting anger was nothing compared to the Montreal Forum fans when Geoffrion scored one goal while crowd-favourite Richard was suspended, and at the time had led the NHL scoring race. The Wings beat the Canadiens in the final round in seven games that year, exactly the same result of the previous season.  "I couldn't deliberately not score, that isn't the point of hockey, Montreal", complained Geoffrion, but fans regardless kept catcalling and jeering him. "I was so feeling the urge to vomit; I felt terrible", Geoffrion emotionally admitted. "Even thinking about hockey made me feel bad, man did I want to leave. If it had not been for Jean (Béliveau) and Maurice (Richard) visiting, I would have. Usually, it's not too much to expect to be on the First (All-Star) Team when you have more points than anyone else."

Early in his playing career, he had a reputation for letting his temper get the best of him. One such example occurred late in the second period of a Canadiens' 3–1 loss to the Rangers at Madison Square Garden on December 20, 1953. With a two-handed swing, Geoffrion's stick made contact with the left side of Ron Murphy's face, resulting in a broken jaw and concussion. The injuries ended Murphy's season. Geoffrion was suspended for the remaining matches between the two teams in that campaign.

In a testament to the rough-and-tumble style of play of that era, Geoffrion broke his nose six times, and received over 400 stitches. In 1958, a training accident severely injured him and his life was saved by emergency surgery. Despite advice from his doctors to stop playing for a season, Geoffrion was on the ice six weeks later to take part in the 1958 Stanley Cup Final.

Geoffrion first retired in 1964 and became head coach of les AS de Québec of the American Hockey League (AHL), but returned two seasons later to play for the New York Rangers. Likely the reason for his first retirement was Béliveau (who was not one of three alternate captains), getting appointed team captain in 1961. This was following the Rocket's retirement in 1960 and Doug Harvey's trade to the Rangers in 1961 (he only lasted a year with the C). Geoffrion, who had had an A, was devastated by the decision to go with Béliveau.

"If I didn't keep suffering all those terrible injuries and yet keep coming back, if I weren't fit to lead, would I have gotten the C and kept playing?" asked Geoffrion, who had, in the 1961 semifinals, hurt a leg and insisted, even so, that Harvey cut a cast off it so he could play. "Yes, I think I would. There were times when everybody kept telling me to quit. My doctor even told me I should stop playing, but I came back."

Coaching career
In 1968 he finally retired as a player and became coach of the Rangers, but resigned after only 43 games due to ulcers in his stomach. In 1972 he became the first coach of the Atlanta Flames, and held the position for two and a half seasons, leading them to their first playoff appearance in 1974.  However, 52 games into his third season, he had to resign due to health problems yet again.  Geoffrion moved to the Flames' broadcast booth, where he became the colour commentator alongside veteran play-by-play man Jiggs McDonald.  He realized a longtime dream of coaching his beloved Canadiens in 1979, but his recurring stomach ailment forced him to step down mid-season.

In the 1970s and into the 1980s, Geoffrion appeared in several television commercials for Miller Lite beer, part of their stable of retired athletes-turned-spokesmen which also included Billy Martin and Bob Uecker.

Family
Geoffrion was the son of Jean-Baptiste Geoffrion, a restaurant owner, and his wife, Florina Poitras. He grew up in Drolet, a suburb east of Montreal. Geoffrion was a direct descendant of Pierre Joffrion and his wife Marie Priault, early French settlers in the colony of Montreal. Marie Priault was a King's Daughter.

Geoffrion's widow Marlene is the daughter of fellow Hockey Hall of Famer Howie Morenz and the granddaughter of the sister of the wife of Billy Coutu, the only player banned from the NHL for life. Geoffrion's son Dan (born January 24, 1958) played five seasons of professional hockey, which included stops with the Quebec Nordiques of the World Hockey Association in 1978–79, Canadiens in 1979–80 (with his father as coach), and Winnipeg Jets in 1980–81. His grandson Blake Geoffrion (born February 3, 1988) played for the Nashville Predators and Montreal Canadiens in the NHL. Dan's younger sons, Sebastian and Brice, played for the University of Alabama in Huntsville Chargers.  Geoffrion's son-in-law, Hartland Monahan, played in the NHL for several teams in the 1970s, and his grandson Shane Monahan played Major League Baseball for the Seattle Mariners in the late 1990s. He, like several former Atlanta Flames players, remained in Atlanta after their careers ended, he lived in Marietta, GA, until his death.

Retired number
The Canadiens announced on October 15, 2005, that Geoffrion's uniform number, 5, would be retired on March 11, 2006. On March 8, Geoffrion was diagnosed with stomach cancer after a surgical procedure uncovered it. Doctors attempted to remove the tumour but found that the cancer had spread. Geoffrion died in Atlanta, Georgia, on March 11, the day his jersey number was to be retired.
During his remarks at the pre-game retirement ceremony, Geoffrion's son Bob recounted how his parents had once gone to a boxing match at the Montreal Forum and that Geoffrion had told his wife Marlene that his own number would someday hang from the rafters beside that of her father, Howie Morenz. Fulfilling that prophecy, and in further recognition of the special link between the Morenz and Geoffrion families, the two numbers were raised side by side (Morenz's banner was lowered halfway and was raised back up to the rafters with Geoffrion's banner). Traded to the Montreal Canadiens by the Nashville Predators on February 17, 2012, Blake Geoffrion decided to honor both his grandfather Geoffrion, as well as his great-grandfather Morenz, by wearing #57.

Awards
Calder Memorial Trophy - 1952
NHL All-Star Game - 1952, 1953, 1954, 1955, 1956, 1958, 1959, 1960, 1961, 1962, 1963
NHL Second All-Star Team - 1955, 1960
Art Ross Trophy - 1955, 1961
Stanley Cup champion - 1953, 1956, 1957, 1958, 1959, 1960
Hart Memorial Trophy - 1961
NHL First All-Star Team - 1961
His number 5 was retired by the Montreal Canadiens on March 11, 2006
In 1998, he was ranked number 42 on The Hockey News list of the 100 Greatest Hockey Players.
 In 2017, Geoffrion was named one of the '100 Greatest NHL Players' in history.

Career statistics

Regular season and playoffs

* Stanley Cup Champion.

Coaching record

See also
List of National Hockey League retired numbers
List of players with five or more goals in an NHL game
List of family relations in the NHL

References

External links
 
Sports E-Cyclopedia's Memoriam to "Boom Boom"
Miller Lite ad

1931 births
2006 deaths
Art Ross Trophy winners
Atlanta Flames announcers
Atlanta Flames coaches
Calder Trophy winners
Calgary Flames coaches
Canadian ice hockey coaches
Canadian ice hockey right wingers
Deaths from cancer in Georgia (U.S. state)
Deaths from stomach cancer
Hart Memorial Trophy winners
Hockey Hall of Fame inductees
Ice hockey people from Montreal
Montreal Canadiens coaches
Montreal Canadiens players
National Hockey League players with retired numbers
New York Rangers coaches
New York Rangers players
Stanley Cup champions
Canadian expatriate ice hockey players in the United States